The following is a list of numbered highways in the Northern Mariana Islands.

Rota has numbers beginning with 1, Tinian beginning with 2, and Saipan beginning with 3.



Rota

Tinian

Saipan

See also

References

Highways
Northern Mariana Islands
Northern Mariana
Northern Mariana